Luigi Ruspoli (born 14 March 1908, date of death unknown) was an Italian sports shooter. He competed in the 100 m running deer event at the 1952 Summer Olympics.

References

1908 births
Year of death missing
Italian male sport shooters
Olympic shooters of Italy
Shooters at the 1952 Summer Olympics
Sportspeople from Rome